Darga is a cantillation mark commonly found in the Torah, Haftarah, and other books. The symbol for the darga resembles a backwards Z.

The darga is usually followed by a Tevir. It is most often found in places where a Tevir clause has two words that are closely related. The Hebrew word דַּרְגָּא translates into English as step. With the Hebrew word tevir meaning "broken," the combination of darga tevir means "broken step." 

Darga can also be followed by a Munach Rivia, and can (rarely) be followed by a Mercha Kefula, an altogether rare trope.

Total occurrences

Melody
The Ashkenazic darga is recited in a fast, downward slope, as follows:

The Sefardic darga is ascending, and the Moroccan darga is descending with a waver in the middle.

References

Cantillation marks